South Jeolla Province (Jeollanam-do), also known as Jeonnam, is a province of South Korea. South Jeolla has a population of 1,902,324 (2014) and has a geographic area of  located in the Honam region at the southwestern tip of the Korean Peninsula. South Jeolla borders the provinces of North Jeolla to the north, South Gyeongsang to the northeast, and Jeju to the southwest in the Korea Strait.

Muan County is the capital and Yeosu is the largest city of South Jeolla, with other major cities including Suncheon, Mokpo, and Gwangyang. Gwangju was the largest city of South Jeolla until becoming a Metropolitan City in 1986, and was the historic capital until the provincial government was relocated to the Muan County town of Namak in 2005.

South Jeolla was established in 1896 from the province of Jeolla, one of the Eight Provinces of Korea, consisting of the southern half of its mainland territory and most outlying islands.

Geography
The province is part of the Honam region, and is bounded on the west by the Yellow Sea, on the north by Jeollabuk-do Province, on the south by Jeju Strait, and on the east by Gyeongsangnam-do.

There are almost 2,000 islands along the coastline, about three quarters of which are uninhabited. Some of the marine products, in particular oyster and seaweed cultivation, are leading in South Korea.

The province is only partially mountainous. The plains along the rivers Seomjin, Yeongsan and Tamjin are suitable for large-scale grain agriculture. There is abundant rainfall in the area, which helps agriculture. The province is also home to the warmest weather on the peninsula. This helps to produce large amounts of agricultural produce, mainly rice, wheat, barley, pulses and potatoes. Vegetables, cotton and fruits are also grown in the province.

A small amount of gold and coal is mined in the province, but industries have also been developed in the area.

Demographics

Administrative divisions
Jeollanam-do is divided into 5 cities (si) and 17 counties (gun). Listed below is the name of each entity in English, hangul, and hanja.

Sister cities and provinces
 State of Arizona, United States
 State of Maryland, United States
 Gyeongsan, South Korea
 Ipswich, Queensland, Australia
 Bà Rịa–Vũng Tàu province, Vietnam
 State of Oregon, United States
 Sichuan Province, China
 Alcochete, Portugal

Religion

According to the census of 2005, of the people of South Jeolla 30.5% follow Christianity (21.8% Protestantism and 8.7% Catholicism) and 16.1% follow Buddhism. 53.4% of the population is mostly not religious or follow Muism and other indigenous religions.

Education

National universities with graduate schools
Chonnam National University - Yeosu Campus
Mokpo National Maritime University – Mokpo
Mokpo National University - Mokpo/Muan County/Yeongam County
Sunchon National University – Suncheon

Private universities with graduate schools
Dongshin University – Naju
Gwangju Catholic University – Naju
Mokpo Catholic University – Mokpo
Sehan University - Yeongam County Campus
Youngsan Won Buddhist University – Yeonggwang County
Chodang University – Muan County
Hanlyo University – Gwangyang

Public institutes of higher education
Jeonnam Provincial College – Damyang County/Jangheung County

Private institutes of higher education
Chunnam Techno University – Gokseong County
Dong-A College – Yeongam County
Hanyeong College – Yeosu
Koguryeo College - Naju
Kwangyang Health College – Gwangyang
Mokpo Science University – Mokpo
Suncheon First College – Suncheon
Suncheon Cheongam College – Suncheon

List of governors of South Jeolla Province
 31st: Heo Kyung-man (July 1, 1995 – July 1, 1998) – 1st term
 32nd: Heo Kyung-man (July 1, 1998 – July 1, 2002) – 2nd term
 33rd: Park Tae-young (July 1, 2002 – April 29, 2004) – 1st term
 34th: Park Jun-young (June 6, 2004 – July 1, 2006) – 1st term
 35th: Park Jun-young (July 1, 2006 – July 1, 2010) – 2nd term
 36th: Park Jun-young (July 1, 2010 – July 1, 2014) – 3rd term
 37th: Lee Nak-yeon (July 1, 2014 – May 12, 2018)
 38th: Kim Yung-rok (July 1, 2018 – )

Tourism

 Yeosu – Jinnamgwan Hall, Hyangiram, Yi Sun Shin Square
 Suncheon – Songgwangsa Temple, Seonamsa Temple, Nagan Eupseong Folk Village
 Mokpo – Mokpo Modern History Museum, Gatbawi Rock, Yudal Mountain
 Haenam – Ttanggut (End of the Land) Village, Mihwangsa Temple
 Gurye – Hwaeomsa Temple
 Damyang – Damyang Juknokwon, Metasequoia-lined Road, Soswaewon Garden
 Boseong – Boseong Green Tea Field Daehan Dawon
 Dochodo – Seonggaksa

References

External links

 
  

 
Provinces of South Korea